Eric Franklin Melgren (born 1956) is the Chief United States district judge of the United States District Court for the District of Kansas.

Education and career
Born in Minneola, Kansas, Melgren received a Bachelor of Arts degree from Wichita State University in 1979 and a Juris Doctor from Washburn University School of Law in 1985. He was a law clerk for Judge Frank G. Theis of the United States District Court for the District of Kansas from 1985 to 1987. He was in private practice in Wichita, Kansas, from 1987 to 2002, and then served as the United States attorney for the District of Kansas from 2002 to 2008. Melgren prosecuted tax avoidance firm Renaissance, The Tax People for defrauding its clients out of at least $84 million, and secured a twenty-five year sentence against the firm's founder, who had been an international fugitive.

Federal judicial service
Melgren was nominated by President George W. Bush on July 23, 2008, to fill a seat in the District of Kansas vacated by Monti Belot. He was confirmed by the United States Senate by a voice vote on September 26, 2008, and received his commission on October 6, 2008. He became Chief Judge on December 1, 2021.

On January 3, 2022, the United States Court of Appeals for the Tenth Circuit held that it was "procedurally unreasonable" for Melgren to impose a harsher sentence on a defendant because she had pled guilty without reaching a plea agreement with the prosecution.

References

Sources

1956 births
Living people
21st-century American judges
Judges of the United States District Court for the District of Kansas
People from Clark County, Kansas
People from Wichita, Kansas
United States Attorneys for the District of Kansas
United States district court judges appointed by George W. Bush
Washburn University alumni
Wichita State University alumni